Boom Beach is a freemium massively multiplayer online real-time strategy game for iOS and Android, developed by Supercell. It was soft launched in Canada on 11 November 2013 and released worldwide on 26 March 2014.

Gameplay

Boom Beach is a strategy game that combines attacks on and from other players with attacks against computer-generated (NPC) bases. The game's storyline is set in a tropical archipelago with the player on an island with defenses and troops (similar to Supercell's Clash of Clans game).

Boom Beach combines single-player campaign play as well as the ability to attack other players in multiplayer mode on the same world map. Featuring an expansive world map that expands as the player progresses, the game pits the player against an enemy known as "The Blackguard", a military force who is invading the archipelago and enslaving the locals for the valuable Power Stones found throughout the archipelago (which can also be used by the player to build buff-providing statues). Computer-generated Blackguard bases often appear on the map, and the player can destroy them for resources. Other notable features on the map include resource bases, which improve resource generation when seized and can be contested by multiple players, as well as dive spots where the player can send a submarine to search for treasure provided they have built it.

The Blackguard is often represented by Lt. Hammerman, a commander who runs several highly fortified headquarters which serve as primary objectives, in addition to occasionally launching attacks on the player's base once they pass a certain level. He also attacks after unlocking the level 15 headquarters and the prototype lab. 
Other computer-generated enemies are Dr. T and Colonel Gearheart, Blackguard members who run specialized bases that occasionally appear as events. Other players appear on the world map as Blackguard mercenaries, allowing players to attack their bases and vice versa. Player bases often offer more rewards for defeating them than CPU bases.

In combat against an enemy base, the player commands a gunboat that starts off with a starting amount of "energy" (which can be improved through upgrades), along with landing crafts which house their troops. Troops can only be deployed on the island's beaches, where they will automatically seek out and attack nearby targets. By spending their gunboat's energy (which is replenished by destroying enemy buildings), the player can provide troops with support such as flares to direct their movement or artillery bombardments to cripple defenses - although the player's troops are susceptible to friendly fire. The objective of an attack is to destroy the enemy's headquarters, as that takes the whole base with it and results in an instant victory, granting the player all of the available resources. Inversely, no matter how much destruction has been caused, failing to destroy the target's headquarters results in a loss, with no resources gained.

There are four primary resources (Gold, Wood, Stone, Iron) which are unlocked as the player progresses, with Diamonds being the premium currency. Gold is used to train troops, explore more regions of the archipelago, purchase upgrades for troops and gunboat abilities, and launch attacks, while the other three are used to construct and upgrade buildings. Buildings include resource generators and storage, defensive measures to defeat attackers, or supportive buildings that provide a myriad of other functions. By upgrading their headquarters, players can unlock more options for their base, more troops, and higher upgrade levels. Diamonds can be used to speed up troop training and building upgrade time.

When a player's Headquarter is upgraded to level 15, Weapon Lab will be opened, but building it requires a large amount of resources. Weapon Lab is a building that offers many choices of powerful temporary defenses and resets once a week. There are 4 main parts players have to look are: Complex Gear, Critical Fuse, Power Rod, and Field Capacitor. Players can find these in Blackguard's bases, Warships chests, or just simply a chest from the Trader. Till now there are 10 prototype weapons for the player to use. Also, the longevity of prototype weapons depends on their grade: I (5 days); II (7 days); III (9 days).

Apart from the main aspect of the game, there is also a cooperative form where players can form groups called Task Forces. Task Forces can gather "Intel" (by destroying troops in defenses, winning attacks, or through special rewards) which is then used to attack computer generated "Power Bases" in various Task Force Operations. These "Power Bases" are often extraordinarily well fortified and possess incredible amounts of defensive firepower, requiring careful teamwork and coordination to destroy. After an Operation has ended, all players in the Task Force will be rewarded based on how many points the Task Force got as a whole, with every building destroyed in a Power Base accounting for one point, which is called a Force Point. Even players who did not participate in the Operation still receive the same amount of resources as the other players. The amount of resource each player received also depends on the number of players in the Task Force. For example, a five-player Task Force with 500 points will have more reward each than a 50-player Task Force with the same number of points.

Warships, a secondary PvP gamemode with season and league progression, is unlocked after the player upgrades to Headquarters Level 10. In this mode, players try to destroy as many of the opponent's Engine Rooms as possible. Whoever has more Engine Room(s) left wins. If the number of Engine Room(s) left is equal, the percentage of destruction will be compared. Whoever destroyed the greater percentage of the opponent's base wins. If the destruction percentage is still equal, then the amount of time left will be compared. Whoever has more time left wins. If the amounts of time left are equal, then the battle is a draw. The winning player earns a number of Stars, depending on rank. The losing player loses a number of Stars, also depending on rank. To climb up ranks, the player needs to earn more star for each tier (Wood + Stone tier 40 stars, Iron tier 60 stars, Gold tier 80 stars, Diamond tier 100 stars, Legendary tier 120 stars).

Reception

The iOS version of Boom Beach was released to "mixed" reviews, according to the review aggregator site Metacritic.

In a review by Stephen Haberman (IGN) he noted that it seemed like a modern version of Clash of Clans, another video game by Supercell.

Legacy 
A spin-off developed by Space Ape set in the Boom Beach universe, Boom Beach: Frontlines is currently being developed and is in beta testing. It was soft launched in Canada on October 19, 2021.

References

2014 video games
IOS games
Android (operating system) games
Video games developed in Finland
Massively multiplayer online real-time strategy games
Supercell (video game company) games